The 2018 Tennessee Volunteers football team represented the University of Tennessee in the 2018 NCAA Division I FBS football season. The Volunteers played their home games at Neyland Stadium in Knoxville, Tennessee and competed in the Eastern Division of the Southeastern Conference (SEC). They were led by first-year head coach Jeremy Pruitt. They finished the season 5–7, 2–6 in SEC play to finish in last place in the Eastern Division.

Previous season
The team finished the season 4–8, 0–8 in SEC play in last place in the Eastern Division and the SEC. They were also the first Tennessee team in program history to lose eight games in a season, as well as the first to not win an SEC game since becoming a charter member of the conference in 1932. They were led by fifth-year head coach Butch Jones until his firing on November 12. Brady Hoke was named the interim head coach for the remainder of the season.

Preseason

2018 recruiting class

Award watch lists
Listed in the order that they were released

SEC media poll
The SEC media poll was released on July 20, 2018 with the Volunteers predicted to finish in sixth place in the East Division.

Preseason All-SEC teams
The Volunteers had one player selected to the preseason all-SEC teams.

Offense

1st team

Trey Smith – OL

Schedule
Tennessee announced its 2018 football schedule on September 19, 2017. The 2018 schedule consisted of 7 home games, 4 away, and 1 neutral site game in the regular season. The Volunteers hosted SEC foes  Florida, Alabama, Kentucky, and Missouri, and traveled to 
Georgia, Auburn, South Carolina, and Vanderbilt.

The Volunteers hosted three of its four non–conference games which were against ETSU from the Southern Conference, UTEP and Charlotte, both of whom competed in the Conference USA. They traveled to Charlotte, North Carolina, for the Belk Kickoff against West Virginia from the Big 12 Conference.

Schedule Source:

Personnel

Roster and staff

Current depth chart 
Source:

Game summaries

vs. West Virginia

Sources:

ETSU

Sources:

UTEP

Sources:

Florida

Sources:

at No. 2 Georgia

Sources:

at Auburn

Sources:

Alabama

Sources:

at South Carolina

Sources:

Charlotte

Sources:

Kentucky

Sources:

Missouri

Sources:

at Vanderbilt

Sources:

References

Tennessee
Tennessee Volunteers football seasons
Tennessee Volunteers football